The Great Dismal is the fourth studio album by American shoegaze band Nothing. It is the only album to feature bassist Aaron Heard (also a member of Jesus Piece), as well as the first to feature Doyle Martin (also a member of Cloakroom) on guitar and backing vocals. The album was released on October 30, 2020, by Relapse Records.

Track listing

Personnel

Nothing
 Domenic Palermo – vocals, guitar, record producer
 Kyle Kimball – percussion
 Aaron Heard  – bass
 Doyle Martin – guitar, backup vocals

Additional personnel
 Nick Bassett - composer
 Alex G - backing vocals (track 3)
 Will Yip - engineer, mastering, mixing, percussion, producer
 Hank Byerly - assistant engineer
 Jackson D. Green - design
 Jordan Hemingway - direction, photography
 Mary Lattimore - harp
 Walter Pearce - art direction
 Shelley Weiss - cello, viola, violin

References

2020 albums
Nothing (band) albums
Relapse Records albums